Andrius Upstas (born 16 January 1969) is a retired Lithuanian international football midfielder. He obtained a total number of five caps for the Lithuania national football team, scoring one goal. He played for FK Inkaras Kaunas, FBK Kaunas and FK Kareda Kaunas during his professional career.

Honours
 Baltic Cup
 1992

References
 

1969 births
Living people
Lithuanian footballers
Lithuania international footballers
Association football midfielders
FK Inkaras Kaunas players
FK Kareda Kaunas players